Tafa may refer to:

Tafa, Local Government Area in Nigeria
Temple of Taffeh, Egypt
Tafa Air, former Albanian low-cost airline
Parachaetolopha tafa, a moth in the family Geometridae found in Papua New Guinea
Shortened version of Mustafa
Tafa Balogun (born 1947), Nigerian Inspector General of the Nigerian Police
Lisiate Tafa (born 1979), Tongan rugby union football player
Nexhati Tafa, Albanian screenwriter
Askale Tafa (born 1984), Ethiopian female marathon runner

See also
Tafas, a town in southern Syria

Ethiopian given names
Amharic-language names